Gavzan Mahalleh may refer to:
 Gavzan Mahalleh, Babol Kenar, Babol County
 Gavzan Mahalleh, Bandpey-ye Sharqi, Babol County
 Gavzan Mahalleh, Babolsar